Annales de la Société entomologique de France is one of the oldest entomology journals in the world. It is published by Taylor & Francis. It publishes original research papers about insects (Hexapoda), Arachnida and Myriapoda: taxonomy, comparative morphology, phylogeny, zoogeography, population genetics, plant-insect relationships, ethology, ecology, biology. Concerning taxonomy, the journal avoids publishing isolated descriptions and gives preference to papers that include ecological, biogeographical, phylogenetical considerations, or comprehensive revisions.

See also
List of entomology journals

References

External links
 
 Annales de la Société entomologique de France, early volumes (1832–1922), at the Biodiversity Heritage Library
 Annales de la Société entomologique de France, early volumes (1832–2002), at Gallica

Entomology journals and magazines
Publications established in 1832
Bimonthly journals
Multilingual journals
Academic journals published by learned and professional societies
Taylor & Francis academic journals